Frank Anthony Bruni (born October 31, 1964) is an American journalist and long-time writer for The New York Times. In June 2011, he was named an op-ed columnist for the newspaper. His columns appear twice weekly and he also writes a weekly newsletter. In April 2021, Times Opinion Editor Kathleen Kingsbury announced that Bruni would be stepping down from his role as a columnist and joining Duke University as an endowed professor of journalism in June 2021. After joining Duke, he has continued to write his Times newsletter and remains a contributing opinion writer for the newspaper.

One of his many previous posts for the newspaper was as its chief restaurant critic, from 2004 to 2009. He is the author of three bestselling books: Born Round, a memoir about his family's love of food and his own struggles with overeating;  Where You Go Is Not Who You'll Be, about college admissions; and Ambling Into History, about George W. Bush. He is currently a CNN contributor.

Education
Bruni was educated at The Loomis Chaffee School, an independent boarding and day college preparatory school in Windsor, Connecticut, followed by the University of North Carolina at Chapel Hill, from which he graduated Phi Beta Kappa in 1986 with a B.A. in English. He was a Morehead Scholar and wrote for the student paper, The Daily Tar Heel. He then attended Columbia University's Graduate School of Journalism, from which he graduated second in his class with a master of science degree in journalism, and also won a Pulitzer Traveling Fellowship.

Life and career
After graduating from Columbia, Bruni joined the staff of the New York Post and then moved on to the Detroit Free Press, where he did a wide range of beats, including a stint covering the Persian Gulf War. He spent more than a year as the movie critic and also wrote extensively about LGBT issues and AIDS. In 1992, he was a runner-up for the Pulitzer Prize in feature writing for his profile of a convicted child molester. In 1995, Bruni took a job with The New York Times as a metropolitan reporter and often wrote for the Times Sunday magazine and for Sunday Arts & Leisure.

In 1998, he was assigned to the Washington, D.C., bureau, where he covered Capitol Hill and Congress, before being sent on the campaign trail to follow then-Texas Governor George W. Bush. He then covered the White House for the first eight months of the Bush administration and served as the Washington-based staff writer for the Sunday magazine. In July 2002, he was promoted to Rome bureau chief. Two years later, he became the Times restaurant critic. After more than five years in that position, he returned briefly to the magazine before becoming an op-ed columnist. In the spring of 2014, he taught a journalism seminar at Princeton University. In 2016, the National Lesbian and Gay Journalists Association gave him its Randy Shilts Award for his career-long contribution to LGBT Americans. He was previously awarded the GLAAD Media Award for Outstanding Newspaper Columnist in 2012 and 2013.

Bruni's book Ambling into History chronicles his time covering Bush's campaign. Born Round deals in part with his time as the Times restaurant critic and was named one of the best nonfiction books of 2009 by The New York Times, Publishers Weekly, The Washington Post and Amazon.com. In the Times Sunday Book Review, Dominique Browning raved that "the love with which Bruni writes about his family is breathtaking." Publishers Weekly deemed Born Round a "powerful, honest book about desire, shame, identity and self-image."

Where You Go Is Not Who You'll Be was published by Grand Central Publishing, an imprint of the Hachette Book Group, in March 2015 and was reissued in an expanded, updated paperback a year later. In a review of it in The Washington Post, Wesleyan University President Michael Roth called it "a humane, measured book" with "lessons for a very wide audience indeed." In February 2017, Bruni released his first cookbook, written with his Times colleague Jennifer Steinhauer titled A Meatloaf in Every Oven. It includes recipes from such prominent chefs as Bobby Flay and April Bloomfield.

Bruni has also done extensive reporting on religion and is the author, with Elinor Burkett, of A Gospel of Shame: Children, Sexual Abuse and the Catholic Church. His freelance work has appeared in several magazines, including Conde Nast Traveler. Although he formalized a relationship with CNN in September 2017 and appears on its shows as a commentator about four times a week, he also appears occasionally on Real Time with Bill Maher, and has been a guest on late-night talk shows as well. He once served as a guest judge on Top Chef and appeared briefly in the movie Julie & Julia, which was written and directed by his friend Nora Ephron.

In February 2018, he published a long and unusually personal column for the Times about an affliction that, overnight, robbed him of functional vision in his right eye. He described the difficult adjustment to that and what it's like to live with the fear of his left eye being affected, too. His memoir, The Beauty of Dusk, published by Simon & Schuster, reflects further on the experience and discusses aging and physical limitations among Baby Boomers who once thought themselves invincible.

In September 2018, Bruni's footprint at the Times expanded to include a weekly newsletter that readers can subscribe to for free. It arrives in their inboxes midday Wednesday every week. It mingles political commentary with cultural riffs and personal reflections.

Bruni's last regularly scheduled opinion column for The New York Times appeared on June 17, 2021.

Personal life
Bruni is openly gay. He has struggled with eating disorders, including bulimia. Bruni relocated from New York City's Upper West Side neighborhood to North Carolina in 2021.

See also
 LGBT culture in New York City
 List of LGBT people from New York City
 New Yorkers in journalism

References

Bibliography 
 The Beauty of Dusk: On Vision Lost and Found, 2022
 A Meatloaf in Every Oven: Two Chatty Cooks, One Iconic Dish and Dozens of Recipes, 2017 with Jennifer Steinhauer Where You Go Is Not Who You'll Be: An Antidote to the College Admissions Mania, 2015
 Born Round: The Secret History of a Full-Time Eater, 2009
 * 
 A Gospel of Shame: Children, Sexual Abuse and the Catholic Church, 1993 with Elinor Burkett

 External links 
 articles by Frank Bruni  The New York Times''
 Author's website

1964 births
Living people
Columbia University Graduate School of Journalism alumni
Critics employed by The New York Times
American gay writers
The New York Times columnists
The New York Times writers
University of North Carolina at Chapel Hill alumni
LGBT people from New York (state)
American LGBT journalists
Gay memoirists
Detroit Free Press people
American restaurant critics
American male non-fiction writers
Loomis Chaffee School alumni